Sture Lindquist (10 November 1910 – 1978) was a Swedish chess player.

Biography
Sture Lindquist was one of Sweden's strongest chess players from the 1930s to the 1950s. Participant of the official and unofficial Swedish Chess Championships.

Sture Lindquist played for Sweden in the Chess Olympiad:
 In 1950, at first reserve board in the 9th Chess Olympiad in Dubrovnik (+1, =2, -2).

References

External links

Sture Lindquist chess games at 365chess.com

1910 births
1978 deaths
Swedish chess players
Chess Olympiad competitors